The Almelo–Salzbergen railway is an important Dutch and German 54 kilometre long railway line, that connects Almelo with Salzbergen, offering a rail link between the Netherlands and Germany.

History

The railway was opened by the Spoorweg-Maatschappij Almelo-Salzbergen (English:  Almelo-Salzbergen railway company) on 18 October 1865, after construction had started in 1862. In Salzbergen the line connected with the Emsland Railway, which had opened in 1855.

The Dutch section of the line (Almelo–Oldenzaal) was electrified in 1951 and the remainder of the line was electrified in 1976.

From 2006 to 2009 the line through Almelo was the subject of a major project called Almelo Verdiept (Almelo Lowered), which moved the railway line through the centre of Almelo into a lowered trench, with sections of tunnels.

Route

The railway connects Almelo in a south easterly direction with Hengelo. Before Hengelo station the line from Zutphen railway station merges into the route. After the station the line to Enschede railway station branches out in a south easterly direction. From Hengelo the line heads north east towards the former border station of Oldenzaal and heads east across the border to Bad Bentheim. Here the electric current changes, which often results in a change from a Dutch to a German locomotive. At Bad Bentheim the private freight railway to Nordhorn and Coevorden branches out, heading north. The line continues through the countryside, until the line merges with the Emsland Railway from Emden before finishing at Salzbergen.

Train services
The Almelo–Salzbergen railway is used by the following passenger services:

 International services across the whole line (Amsterdam Centraal–Berlin)
 Intercity services between Almelo and Hengelo (Schiphol/The Hague/Rotterdam–Enschede)
 Stoptrein services between Almelo and Hengelo (Apeldoorn/Zwolle–Enschede) and Hengelo–Bad Bentheim (Zutphen–Oldenzaal, Hengelo–Bad Bentheim)
 Eurobahn services between Hengelo and Salzbergen (Hengelo–Bad Bentheim–Osnabrück–Bielefeld)

Train types
A wide variety of trains can be found regularly on the Almelo–Salzbergen railway:

 NS Class 1700 on the Schiphol–Berlin service between Almelo and Bad Bentheim
 DB Class 101 or DB Class 120 on the Schiphol–Berlin service between Bad Bentheim and Berlin
 NS Koploper on the Schiphol/The Hague/Rotterdam–Enschede service between Almelo and Hengelo
 NS Sprinter on the Apeldoorn–Enschede service between Almelo and Hengelo
 NS Buffel on the Zwolle–Enschede service between Almelo and Hengelo
 Syntus Buffel on the Hengelo–Bad Bentheim service between Hengelo and Bad Bentheim
 Syntus Lint41 on the Zutphen–Oldenzaal service between Hengelo and Oldenzaal
 Stadler Flirt on the Hengelo–Bielefeld service between Bad Bentheim and Salzbergen

There are also large number of freight trains operating along the line.

Gallery

External links 
 Photo: Westfalenbahn, ET011
 Photo: DB 110 468, Salzbergen
 Photo: DBS 152 099 + DBS 139 132 + Autotrein

Railway lines in the Netherlands
Railway lines in Lower Saxony
International railway lines
Railway lines opened in 1865
1865 establishments in Europe